Joe Moore (22 November 1894 – 22 August 1926) was an Irish-born American film actor.

Biography
Moore appeared in 40 films between 1911 until 1926. His brothers were also actors: Tom Moore, Owen Moore and Matt Moore.

He was born in Fordstown Crossroads, County Meath, Ireland and died in Santa Monica, California from a heart attack.

Partial filmography
The Staff of Age (1912)
 Goat Getter (1925)

External links

1894 births
1926 deaths
20th-century American male actors
American male film actors
Irish male silent film actors
American male silent film actors
Irish emigrants to the United States (before 1923)
Actors from County Meath
20th-century Irish male actors